Yolanda Eugenia González Hernández (born 1 January 1956) is a Mexican politician affiliated with the Institutional Revolutionary Party. As of 2014 she served as Senator of the LVIII and LIX Legislatures of the Mexican Congress representing San Luis Potosí and as Deputy of the LVI Legislature. She also served as a local deputy in the LI and LIII Legislatures of the Congress of San Luis Potosí.

References

1956 births
Living people
Women members of the Senate of the Republic (Mexico)
Members of the Senate of the Republic (Mexico)
Members of the Chamber of Deputies (Mexico)
Members of the Congress of San Luis Potosí
Institutional Revolutionary Party politicians
20th-century Mexican politicians
20th-century Mexican women politicians
21st-century Mexican politicians
21st-century Mexican women politicians
Women members of the Chamber of Deputies (Mexico)
Politicians from San Luis Potosí
People from San Luis Potosí City